
The following tables list all the tallest buildings and structures in Bahrain. Most of these buildings and structures are located in the capital of Manama.

List of tallest buildings

List of tallest structures

List of tallest buildings under construction

See also
 List of tallest buildings and structures in the world
 List of twin structures
 Pearl Monument, an iconic structure in Bahrain.
 Fakhro Tower

References

Tallest Structures
Tallest Structures
Bahrain
Bahrain
Lists of buildings and structures in Bahrain